Allen & Collens was an architectural partnership between Francis Richmond Allen and Charles Collens that was active from 1904 to 1931. Allen had previously worked in the Boston-based partnerships Allen & Kenway (1878–91) and Allen & Vance (1896–98), which executed Lathrop House (1901) and Davison House (1902) at Vassar College. The firm was known for its Gothic Revival design work.

Francis R. Allen died in November 1931. Charles Collens continued to practice under the name Collens, Willis and Beckonert. Collens died in September 1956.

Notable works
 "Sonnenberg" for Frederick Ferris and Mary Clark Thompson, Canandaigua, New York (1885–87)
 "Twin Oaks" for Gardiner Greene Hubbard, Washington, D.C. (1888)
 Thompson Memorial Library, Vassar College, Poughkeepsie, New York (1905)
 Union Theological Seminary, W. 120th St. and Broadway, New York, New York (1908–10)
 William Oxley Thompson Memorial Library, Ohio State University, Columbus, Ohio (1910–12)
 United States Post Office, 28 N. Main St., Canandaigua, New York (1910)
 Knox United Church, Calgary, Alberta (1912–13)
 Second Church in Newton, Newton, Massachusetts (1914–16)
 Reformed Dutch Church of Poughkeepsie, 70 Hooker Ave. Poughkeepsie, New York (1921)
 Central Presbyterian Church, 593 Park Avenue, New York, New York (1922)
 Hartford Seminary Foundation, 55 Elizabeth St. and 72-120 Sherman St. Hartford, Connecticut (1923–29)
 Lindsey Chapel, Emmanuel Episcopal Church, Boston (1924)
 Trinity United Methodist Church, 361 Sumner Avenue, Springfield, MA 01108 (1924) http://www.trinityspringfield.org
 United Congregational Church, 877 Park Ave. Bridgeport, Connecticut (1924–26)
 "Stillington Hall" for Leslie Buswell, Gloucester, Massachusetts (1925)
 Newton City Hall and War Memorial, 1000 Commonwealth Ave. Newton, Massachusetts (1931)
 First Parish Church, 87 School St., Waltham, Massachusetts (1932–33)
 The Cloisters museum buildings, Fort Tryon Park, New York, New York (1934–38)

Notes

References

External links
Allen & Collens works. Held by the Department of Drawings & Archives, Avery Architectural & Fine Arts Library, Columbia University.

Architecture firms based in New York (state)
Design companies established in 1904
1904 establishments in New York (state)
20th-century American architects
Design companies disestablished in 1931
1931 disestablishments in New York (state)
American companies disestablished in 1931
American companies established in 1904